Crimean Regional Government ( Krymskoe kraevoe pravitel'stvo) refers to two successive short-lived regimes in the Crimean Peninsula during 1918 and 1919.

History
Following Russia's 1917 October Revolution, an ethnic Tatar government proclaimed the Crimean People's Republic. The republic was soon overrun by Bolshevik forces in early 1918 who established the Taurida Soviet Socialist Republic and then by the forces of the Ukrainian People's Republic with a military assistance from the German Empire in the Crimean Offensive at the end of April 1918.

The first Crimean Regional Government was established on 25 June 1918. It was formed under German protection with Lipka Tatar General Maciej (Suleyman) Sulkiewicz as prime minister, minister of interior and military affairs. There were efforts by Ukraine to exert control over Crimea but, with German support, the regional government remained separate from Ukraine though, in September and October, there were talks to effect a federation of the two.

Following the withdrawal of German troops from Crimea, the unpopular Sulkiewicz fell from power on 25 November 1918 and was succeeded by Crimean Karaite politician and former Kadet member Solomon Krym. This liberal, anti-Bolshevik regime included fellow former Kadet member Maxim Vinaver as foreign minister and Vladimir D. Nabokov as minister of justice. In late November 1918, troops of the Allies of World War I, mainly French and Greek, landed in Crimea but they withdrew in April 1919, after the loss of Odessa.

The Krym government, also called the Crimean Frontier Government, began to crumble in early 1919 due to tensions with the Russian White movement's Volunteer Army under Anton Denikin which suspected the loyalty of its main figures. The collapse of the World War I Central Powers and the withdrawal of the Allies had made the Crimea again fully dependent on Russia.

On 2 April 1919, the Soviet Red Army occupied Simferopol and the second Crimean Regional Government was dissolved. The Crimean Socialist Soviet Republic was then established only to be retaken by White forces in June 1919. The Whites under Denikin and later Pyotr Wrangel held Crimea until November 1920.

See also 

 Post-Russian Empire states
 Russian Civil War

References

Russian Revolution in Ukraine
Crimea during the Russian Civil War
Politics of Crimea
Political history of Ukraine
Post–Russian Empire states
Former unrecognized countries
1918 establishments in Ukraine
1919 disestablishments in Ukraine
States and territories established in 1918
States and territories disestablished in 1919
Former client states
Political history of Crimea